The canton of Gérardmer is an administrative division of the Vosges department, in northeastern France. At the French canton reorganisation which came into effect in March 2015, it was expanded from 3 to 17 communes (2 of which merged into the new commune Granges-Aumontzey). Its seat is in Gérardmer.

It consists of the following communes:

Anould 
Arrentès-de-Corcieux
Ban-sur-Meurthe-Clefcy
Barbey-Seroux
La Chapelle-devant-Bruyères
Corcieux
Fraize
Gérardmer
Gerbépal
Granges-Aumontzey
La Houssière
Liézey
Plainfaing
Le Valtin
Vienville
Xonrupt-Longemer

References

Cantons of Vosges (department)